Lorina Papali'i (née Buckley; born 16 January 1977) is a former New Zealand rugby league and rugby union footballer from the 1990s, 2000s and 2010s.

A dual international, she represented New Zealand in rugby league and Samoa in rugby union.

Background
Born in Hamilton, New Zealand, Papali'i went to school in Newcastle, Australia before returning to New Zealand. Her son, Isaiah, is a New Zealand and Samoan rugby league international.

Playing career

Rugby league
In 1994, Papali'i made her Test debut for New Zealand while playing for the Richmond Rovers. She was later a member of New Zealand's successful 2000 and 2003 Women's Rugby League World Cup squads.

Papali'i enjoyed a long career with Richmond, winning the club's Player of the Year award four times (1996, 1997, 2001, 2002) and Forward of the Year award three times (1994, 1995, 2003). In 2002, she won the New Zealand Women's Nationals Player of the Tournament and in 2004 won the NZRL Player of the Year. In 2010, she retired from rugby.

On 1 August 2018, Papali'i came out of retirement and was named in the New Zealand Warriors NRL Women's Premiership squad.

In Round 1 of the 2018 NRL Women's season, she made her debut for the Warriors in a 10–4 win over the Sydney Roosters. In doing so, Papali'i and her son Isaiah (who played for the Warriors' men's team) became the first mother and son to play for the same club.

Rugby union
In 2002 and 2006, Papali'i represented Samoa at the Rugby World Cup.

References

External links
Richmond Rovers profile

1977 births
Living people
New Zealand sportspeople of Samoan descent
New Zealand female rugby league players
New Zealand women's national rugby league team players
Rugby league second-rows
New Zealand Warriors (NRLW) players
Samoa women's national rugby union team players